J. Harold Walcott (died 30 April 1995) was a West Indian cricket umpire. He stood in four Test matches between 1948 and 1958. He was the uncle of the West Indian cricketer Clyde Walcott.

See also
 List of Test cricket umpires

References

Year of birth missing
1995 deaths
Place of birth missing
West Indian Test cricket umpires